Torpado is an Italian bicycle manufacturing company that was founded in 1895 in Padua, Italy.

History 

Between 1951 and 1962, Torpado sponsored a professional road cycling team that competed in 11 editions of the Giro d'Italia.

In 2001, the company was bought by Cycles Esperia, who also acquired several other major brands including Bottecchia, Graziella, Stucchi, and, in 2006, Fondriest, which was founded by former professional cyclist Maurizio Fondriest.

They currently specialize in producing mountain bikes, and also sponsor a professional mountain biking team, the Torpado Factory Team.

See also

 List of bicycle parts
 List of Italian companies

References

External links
 Torpado Official website

Vehicle manufacturing companies established in 1895
Italian companies established in 1895
Italian brands
Cycle manufacturers of Italy
Electric bicycles
Companies based in Veneto
Mountain bike manufacturers